Kia Challengers Field (기아 챌린저스 필드) is a baseball stadium in Hampyeong, South Korea and home to the Kia Tigers.

Baseball venues in South Korea
Sport in South Jeolla Province
Challengers Field
Hampyeong County
Sports venues completed in 2013
2013 establishments in South Korea